Ghazzawi is an Arabic surname meaning  from Gaza. Notable people with the surname include:

 Abdel Hamid al-Ghazzawi, Libyan terror suspect
 Izzat Ghazzawi, Palestinian writer

Arabic-language surnames